Highway 969 is a provincial highway in the north-east region of the Canadian province of Saskatchewan. It runs from Highway 2 to Highway 165.

Route description 
Highway 969 begins at Highway 2 just east of Prince Albert National Park. From there, the road heads east and then swings to the north-east. Highway 969 enters the town of Montreal Lake, which is named after the nearby Montreal Lake. Highway 926 meets Highway 969 just to the east of Montreal Lake and heads east from there. Now paralleling the lake, Highway 969 passes through Timber Bay.

The highway then heads north to the beginning of Montreal River where the original community of Molanosa was located and then continues north to its northern terminus at Highway 165. Highway 969 comes within a few hundred metres of the exact geographical centre of the province of Saskatchewan, which is near the community of Molanosa.

History 
The highway was originally part of Provincial Highway 2 that connected Prince Albert to La Ronge.  Highway 2 was realigned in the 1960s, and the route was renumbered as Highway 169, but was re-numbered to Highway 969 in the early 1980s as part of the establishment of the 900-series highways. Highway 969 used to follow Candle Lake Road south of Montreal Lake; however, when the road was removed from the provincial highway system, and Highway 969 was re-aligned to follow former Highway 930.

Major intersections 
From south to north. The entire route is in the Northern Saskatchewan Administration District and Division No. 18.

See also
Roads in Saskatchewan
Transportation in Saskatchewan

References 

969